Rowan James Sherriff (born 7 July 1951 in Sheffield, Tasmania) is a former Australian cricketer, who played for Tasmania. He was a left-handed fast-medium bowler who only represented the team from 1976 until 1979.

See also
 List of Tasmanian representative cricketers

External links
Cricinfo Profile

1951 births
Living people
Australian cricketers
Tasmania cricketers
Cricketers from Tasmania